was a Japanese businessman. He was chairman of Sumitomo Chemical and was also the chairman of the Japan Business Federation (Nippon Keidanren).

Education
Yonekura received a bachelor's degree in law from University of Tokyo in 1960. He received his master's degree in 1964 from Duke University, where he subsequently he earned his PhD.

Career
Yonekura joined Sumitomo Chemical in 1960 and worked his way up through the ranks to become president in 2000. He remained in this position until 2009, when he became chairman of the board.

He became chairman of the Japan Business Federation on May 27, 2010. In 2010 he received the Petrochemical Heritage Award in recognition of his contribution to the petrochemical industry.

Awards 

 2014 - Honorary Citizen of Singapore

References

1937 births
Japanese chief executives
University of Tokyo alumni
Duke University alumni
2018 deaths
Honorary Citizens of Singapore